Mohamed Abdelsalam (born 24 May 1987) is an Egyptian professional footballer who plays as a left midfielder for the Egyptian club Al Nasr. He started his career in youth level in El Sharkia, and moved to Al Ahly in the same level when he was 10. He then moved to Haras El Hodoud where he won two Egypt Cups, one of which was against Al Ahly, and an Egyptian Super Cup against Al Ahly too.

Abdelsalam got injured and suffered from a dislocated ankle and a broken fibula during his match with Petrojet against Masry in 2014–15 Egyptian Premier League. Following this injury, Petrojet terminated the contract and refused to continue the healing of the player, Ettihad El Shorta though decided to sign the player for three years in addition to healing him by their side.

References

1987 births
Living people
Egyptian footballers
Association football midfielders
Petrojet SC players
El Raja SC players